Henry David Greene,  (1843 – 11 October 1915) was a British barrister and Conservative Party politician.

The son of Benjamin Buck Greene, a governor of the Bank of England, Greene was educated at Trinity College, Cambridge (MA, LLM) and was called to the bar at the Middle Temple in 1868. He practiced in London and on the Oxford Circuit, and took silk in 1885.

He was elected to the House of Commons as a Conservative for Shrewsbury in 1892, and was returned unopposed in 1895 and 1900. He was a member of the Royal Commission on the Feeble-Minded and an unpaid Commissioner in Lunacy from 1908 to 1914. He was Treasurer of the Middle Temple in 1910.

References

External links
 

UK MPs 1892–1895
1915 deaths
Alumni of Trinity College, Cambridge
Members of the Middle Temple
English King's Counsel
Conservative Party (UK) MPs for English constituencies
English barristers
English justices of the peace
Deputy Lieutenants in England
UK MPs 1895–1900
UK MPs 1900–1906
19th-century King's Counsel
20th-century King's Counsel